Koh Jia Ler (born 11 November 2000) is a Singaporean actor known for starring in the Anthony Chen films Ilo Ilo and Wet Season.

Career
Koh starred in the 2013 drama film Ilo Ilo. For his performance in the film, he was nominated for the Golden Horse Award for Best New Performer. He had a supporting role in Life - Fear Not. He starred in the 2019 drama film Wet Season. For his performance in the film, he was nominated for the Golden Horse Award for Best Supporting Actor. He will appear in We Are All Strangers, the upcoming final installment of Anthony Chen's Growing Up trilogy.

Filmography

Film
Ilo Ilo (2013)
Wet Season (2019)
We Are All Strangers

Television
Life - Fear Not (2015)
Midsummer Is Full of Love (2020)

References

Living people
Singaporean male film actors
Singaporean male television actors
2000 births